Jason Kingsley may refer to:

 Jason Kingsley (actor) (born 1974), American actor
 Jason Kingsley (businessman) (born 1964), British businessman